Trenton Subdivision can refer to the following railroad lines:

Trenton Subdivision (CSX Transportation)
Trenton Subdivision (Union Pacific Railroad)